{{Album ratings
| rev1 = Muzik
| rev1Score = <ref>{{Cite magazine |last=Bush |first=Calvin |date=August 1996 |title=The Black Dog: Music For Adverts (And Short Films) |url=http://www.muzikmagazine.co.uk/issues/muzik015_august_1996.pdf |magazine=Muzik |issue=15 |page=116 |archive-url=https://web.archive.org/web/20220402181226/http://www.muzikmagazine.co.uk/issues/muzik015_august_1996.pdf |archive-date=2 April 2022 |access-date=16 July 2022}}</ref>
}}Music for Adverts (and Short Films)'' is the first solo album by Ken Downie under the name The Black Dog which was released in 1996 on double vinyl, cassette, and CD. It was the first without participation by Ed Handley and Andy Turner who left to continue their work as Plaid.

The album continues Ken Downie's passion for the ancient world and magic. Downie's own favorite tracks came to be "The Wind Spirit" "[...] and 'Euthanasia' because it gives me goosebumps. And 'Kheprit', because it sums up everything about the Black Dog in 7 minutes."

Track listing
 "Dumb and Dumber" – 1:37
 "The Wind Spirit" – 2:10
 "Jordan" – 1:47
 "Tzaddi" – 4:18
 "Pod #1" – 1:35
 "No Lamers" – 4:30
 "Edgar Allan" – 3:50
 "Harpo" – 0:39
 "Strange Hill" – 3:06
 "The Big Issue" – 3:03
 "Crayola" – 2:06
 "Horny" – 1:09
 "AGW" – 1:22
 "Seti" – 1:03
 "Darkness" – 2:58
 "Euthanasia" – 5:22
 "Gerry Norman" – 0:57
 "Meditation No. #4" – 3:41
 "Stratus" – 1:04
 "Dissidence" – 1:02
 "As Clouds Go By" – 1:02
 "Disench" – 1:30
 "Minour" – 4:37
 "Mo" – 3:07
 "Wot" – 0:33
 "Kheprit" – 6:52

Composed & produced by Ken Downie

References

External links
 Music for Adverts (and Short Films) at discogs.com

1996 albums
The Black Dog (band) albums